Metergoline, also known as methergoline and sold under the brand names Contralac (veterinary) and Liserdol (clinical), is a monoaminergic medication of the ergoline group which is used as a prolactin inhibitor in the treatment of hyperprolactinemia (high prolactin levels) and to suppress lactation.

Pharmacology

Pharmacodynamics
Metergoline is a ligand of various serotonin and dopamine receptors.

References

External links
 

Antipsychotics
Carbamates
Dopamine agonists
Ergolines
Prolactin inhibitors
Serotonin receptor antagonists